Events from the year 1765 in art.

Events 

 June 12 – The death of General John Guise in London activates his 1760 bequest of a large collection of Old Master paintings to his alma mater, Christ Church, Oxford, where they are assembled in 1767 as the foundation of Christ Church Picture Gallery.
 September 23 - G. Van Oostrum's collection of paintings is sold at auction in The Hague. Smiling Girl, a Courtesan, Holding an Obscene Image is lot 241.
 The Uffizi in Florence is officially opened to the public as an art gallery.
 Irish sculptor Christopher Hewetson and American painter Henry Benbridge arrive in Rome, where Hewetson settles.
 The Hermitage Museum acquires the art collection of Heinrich von Brühl, including Perseus and Andromeda by Rubens.

Works

Francis Cotes – Portrait of Maria Walpole, Countess Waldegrave
Nathaniel Dance – William Weddell, The Reverend William Palgrave and Mr Janson in Rome
Jean-Honoré Fragonard – The High Priest Coresus Sacrificing Himself to Save Callirhoe
Anton Graff – Self-portrait
Tilly Kettle – Portrait of Mrs. Yates as Mandane in 'The Orphan of China' (approximate date; Tate Britain)
William Pars – The Parthenon when it contained a mosque (Published in James Stuart and Nicholas Revett, The Antiquities of Athens, London, 1789)
Joshua Reynolds
Portrait of John Murray, 4th Earl of Dunmore
Robert Clive and his family with an Indian maid
George Stubbs – Portrait of a Hunting Tyger (Cheetah with two Indian attendants and a stag)
Richard Wilson – Lake Avernus I (approximate date)

Births
February 21 – Michał Ceptowski, Bavarian born stucco artist who settles and worked in Poland (died 1829)
March 3 – Francesco Alberi, Italian painter of historical scenes and frescoes (died 1836)
March 7 – Nicéphore Niépce, French inventor and pioneer photographer (died 1833)
April 1 – Luigi Schiavonetti, Italian artist (died 1810)
May 7 – Giovanni Monti, Italian landscape painter (died 1825)
May 13 – Vieira Portuense, Portuguese painter (died 1805)
June 10 – Cladius Detlev Fritzsch, also known as C. D. Fritzsch, Danish flower painter (died 1841)
December 3 – Adélaïde Dufrénoy, French poet and painter from Brittany (died 1825)
date unknown 
Pietro Bonato, Italian painter and engraver (died 1820)
Edme-François-Étienne Gois, French sculptor (died 1836)
Thomas Kirk, British painter and engraver (died 1797)
Domenico Vantini, Italian painter specializing in portrait miniatures (died 1825)
1765/1770 – Fryderyk Bauman, Polish architect and sculptor-decorator (died 1845)

Deaths
February 10 – Jean-Baptiste-Henri Deshays, French painter (born 1729)
April 15 – Mikhail Lomonosov, Russian polymath, scientist, writer and mosaic artist (born 1711)
May – Joseph Badger, American portrait artist (born 1707)
July 15 – Charles-André van Loo, French subject painter (born 1705), and a younger brother of Jean-Baptiste van Loo
August 1 – Ulla Adlerfelt, Swedish painter and noblewoman (born 1736)
August 18 – Jean-Joseph Balechou, French engraver (born 1715)
September 5 – Johann Christian Fiedler, German portrait painter (born 1697)
October 21 – Giovanni Paolo Pannini or Panini, Italian painter and architect, mainly known as one of the vedutisti or veduta or view painters (born 1691)
December 5 – Johann Salomon Wahl, German painter who became court painter in Denmark (born 1689)
date unknown
Pietro Campana, Spanish engraver (born 1727)
Giovanni Battista Chiappe, Italian painter of the late-Baroque period (born 1723)
Corrado Giaquinto, Italian Rococo painter (born 1703)
Ercole Graziani the Younger, Italian painter (born 1688)
James MacArdell, Irish engraver of mezzotints (born 1729)
Zheng Xie, Chinese painter of orchids, bamboo, and stones; one of the Eight Eccentrics of Yangzhou (born 1693)
Giampietro Zanotti, Italian painter and art historian (born 1674)
Jacopo Zoboli, Italian etcher and painter of altarpieces and portraits (born 1700)

References

 
Years of the 18th century in art
1760s in art